Juliana Paiva dos Santos (born 28 March 1993) is a Brazilian actress.

Biography 
Paiva was born in Rio de Janeiro, the daughter of a former model. After her family moved with her to the state of Ceará, she studied acting and joined theater groups. After completing 14 years old she returned to Rio de Janeiro, convinced to work as an actress and, in 2009, she joined an acting agency. Juliana Paiva debuted in television in the Rede Globo telenovela Cama de Gato, followed by a guest star in Viver a Vida.

Juliana Paiva played Valquíria Spina in the 2010 remake of the telenovela Ti Ti Ti. She debuted in cinema in the same year in the teen film Desenrola playing Tize.

She guest starred as Camila in Cheias de Charme in 2010. Juliana Paiva joined the cast of the twentieth season of Malhação as a promiscuous girl named Fatinha, a popular girl who seduced the school boys. Juliana Paiva became a teen icon because of the popularity of her character. She played the lead role, Lili, in the 2013 Rede Globo telenovela Além do Horizonte.

Filmography

Television

Film

Theater

Internet

Videography

Awards and nominations

References

External links 
 

1993 births
Living people
Actresses from Rio de Janeiro (city)
Brazilian television actresses
Brazilian telenovela actresses
Brazilian film actresses
Brazilian stage actresses